Crnoljeva (or Mali i Carralevës) is a mountain in central Kosovo, dividing its two main geographical regions, the Kosovo Plain and Metohija. Crnoljeva is also a point where all three drainage basins of Kosovo (and three out of four in the Balkans) meet, making the mountain a major hydrographic knot. It is named after the village of Crnoljevo.

Crnoljeva is located in the south-central part of Kosovo, between the valleys of the rivers Drenica (to the east) and Mirusha and Toplluha (to the west). The mountain is elongated in the north–south direction and divides the Prizren depression of Metohija from the Drenica region of the Kosovo Plain. The highest peak is Topila (1,177 m), while the Drmanska glava peak (926 m) is point of the hydrographic knot. Another prominent peak is the Korenik (1,142 m).

Crnoljeva is rich in ores, most notably the chromium, magnesite and coal. Right through the middle of the mountain goes the regional Ferizaj-Prizren road, using the natural route of the Carralevë river valley.

Some rivers originating from the mountain are:

 Drenica, Topila and Crnoljeva; through the Sitnica they drain the area into the Black Sea;
 Nerodimka; through the Lepenac it drains the area into the Aegean Sea;
 Banja, Mirusha and Toplluha; through the White Drin they drain the area into the Adriatic Sea;

Larger settlements around the Crnoljeva are Štimlje (east), Suva Reka, Bllacë, Banja, Mališevo (west), Lapušnik, Komorane (north) and Crnoljevo (east).

Notes

References 

Mountains of Kosovo